Gerontophobia is the fear of age-related self-degeneration (similar to Gerascophobia), or a hatred or fear of the elderly due to memento mori. The term comes from the Greek γέρων – gerōn, "old man" and  φόβος – phobos, "fear". Gerontophobia has been linked to Thanatophobia as fear of old age can be a precursor to fear of death. Gerontophobia can be caused by harmful stereotypes of elderly people displayed in the media

Ageism
Discriminatory aspects of ageism have been strongly linked to gerontophobia. This irrational fear or hatred of the elderly can be associated with the expectation that someday all young people including oneself will be old inevitably and suffer from the irreversible health decline that comes with old age, which is associated with disability, disease, and death. The sight of aged people could be a possible reminder of death (memento mori) and inevitable biological vulnerability. This unwillingness to accept these can manifest in feelings of hostility and discriminatory acts towards the elderly.

History 
Old age was previously seen as a golden age in the Middle Ages Around the time of the Anglo-Saxons there was a shift towards more negative views of the elderly, which led to more and more literature developing a Gerontophobic view.

Portrayal in Literature and the Media 
Gerontophobia is heavily portrayed in literature and the media starting as early as Anglo-saxon poetry but is also found in common literary classics such as Shakespeare's King Lear, Jonathan Swift's Gulliver's Travels, and Jane Austen's Persuasion Gerontophobia can also be found in many TV shows and movies.

Treatments for Gerontophobia 
Treatment for Gerontophobia can include better education about the elderly and aging as well as an increase in exposure and insight therapy.

See also
 Gerascophobia
 Gerontocracy
 Intergenerational equity
 List of phobias

References

External links
 AGEISM AND AGING UP: A Q and A with Mariah
 MedFriendly
 Age Wave

Ageism
Ageing
Anxiety disorders
Old age
Phobias